Ebersbach is a former town in the district Görlitz, in Saxony, Germany. It lies 20 km northwest of Zittau, and 23 km southeast of Bautzen. Since 1 January 2011, it has been part of the town Ebersbach-Neugersdorf.

International relations

Ebersbach is twinned with:
 Bourg-lès-Valence, France
 Ebersbach an der Fils, Germany
 Jiříkov, Czech Republic

References

External links 

Populated places in Görlitz (district)
Ebersbach-Neugersdorf